Ilex serrata is a species in the Ilex (holly) genus and the family Aquifoliaceae. It is an evergreen shrub or small tree up to about 4.5 m high. In Japan where it naturally occurs, it is a hardy species with ovate dark green leaves, pink flowers and red berries on the female plant.

References 

serrata
Trees of Japan
Trees of Korea